Their Last Night (French: Leur dernière nuit) is a 1953 French crime drama film directed by Georges Lacombe and starring Jean Gabin, Madeleine Robinson and Robert Dalban. It was shot at the Billancourt Studios in Paris and on location around the city. The film's sets were designed by the art director Léon Barsacq.

Synopsis
Madeleine, a young teacher from the provinces, arrives in Paris and encounters Pierre Ruffin a seemingly respectable librarian who lives at the same lodging as her in Montmartre. However he comes in one night wounded by a bullet and admits to her that he leads a double life as a gangster. After killing one of his accomplices who has betrayed him, the police net closes in on him. He returns to spend one final night of love with Madeleine before fleeing to Belgium, but he is tracked down by the law.

Cast

References

Bibliography
 Harriss, Joseph. Jean Gabin: The Actor Who Was France. McFarland, 2018.

External links 
 

1953 films
French crime films
1950s French-language films
French black-and-white films
1953 crime films
Films directed by Georges Lacombe
Films shot at Billancourt Studios
Films shot in Paris
Films set in Paris
1950s French films